Polyhymno furcatella is a moth of the family Gelechiidae. It was described by Anthonie Johannes Theodorus Janse in 1950. It is found in South Africa (Limpopo, North-West province).

References

Endemic moths of South Africa
Moths described in 1950
Polyhymno